"Let Your Spirit Fly" is a song performed by Jan Johansen and Pernilla Wahlgren in Sweden's preselection for the Eurovision Song Contest, Melodifestivalen 2003. The song finished in second place.

The song was later covered by Ragni Malmsten and Philipp Kirkorov.

Charts

References 

Melodifestivalen songs of 2003
English-language Swedish songs
Pernilla Wahlgren songs
Jan Johansen (singer) songs
2003 songs